Camille Pelissier (29 August 1859 – 28 September 1943) was a French politician.

He was born in Forcalquier (Alpes-de-Haute-Provence, France. He was a lawyer, a member of the general council, and a senator for Basses-Alpes between 1907 and 1912. He was active in discussing topics relevant to his department. He died in Marseille Bouches-du-Rhône, France.

Sources 
 Jean Jolly (dir.), Dictionnaire des parlementaires français, Presses universitaires de France

1859 births
1943 deaths
French Senators of the Third Republic
Senators of Alpes-de-Haute-Provence
19th-century French lawyers